Caln is a census-designated place (CDP) in Caln Township, Chester County, Pennsylvania. The population was 1,519 at the 2010 census. It is located east of the city of Coatesville and lies west of Philadelphia.

Geography
The Lincoln Highway, also known as U.S. Route 30 Business, forms the southern edge of the CDP. Caln CDP extends north as far as Pennsylvania Route 340.

Demographics

References

Census-designated places in Chester County, Pennsylvania
Census-designated places in Pennsylvania